The 1892 United States presidential election in South Carolina took place on November 8, 1892, as part of the 1892 United States presidential election. Voters chose 9 representatives, or electors to the Electoral College, who voted for president and vice president.

South Carolina voted for the Democratic nominee, former President Grover Cleveland, who was running for a second, non-consecutive term, over Republican nominee, incumbent President Benjamin Harrison. Cleveland won the state by a landslide margin of 58.63%.

Results

Results by county

Notes

References

South Carolina
1892
1892 South Carolina elections